Mohammed A. F. Al-Rawi (1952 - 2003) was a Medical Specialist/Physician, the president of Baghdad University, the chairman of the Iraqi Doctors Union, and the Ex-dean of College of Medicine University of Baghdad at the time of his death. Following the 2003 invasion of Iraq, Al-Rawi was reinstated as president of Baghdad University by US Deputy Proconsul Robin Raphel in May 2003 but he opted not to serve in this position while the country is under foreign control.

Academic qualifications and career
Al-Rawi was a professor at Baghdad University College of Medicine. He gained the UK MRCP degree in Medicine. He was a member of the Arab Board of Medicine and a member of the Iraqi Board of Medicine.

Medical school and postgraduate years
Al-Rawi entered Baghdad University College of Medicine in September 1971. Although he was already a full member in the Baath party, he kept a low political profile initially. It is said that he was following in the foot steps of his uncle, who helped him by promoting his Baath Party career.

He worked closely with the Students Union (National Union of Iraqi Student, NUIS). He was known to be affable, outgoing and gregarious.

Despite his political interests, he was dedicated academically and behaved like a model medical student who rarely missed a lecture. Although he was not the top of his class, he achieved a reasonably high marks on merits. After graduation with M.B.Ch.B. in 1977, he became a lecturer in Physiology in Baghdad University College of Medicine.

Al-Rawi was soon sent to the UK to achieve the MRCP degree. With him, there were several other newly graduated doctors who mostly ended up returning to Iraq to raise the profile of their medical institutions.

Circumstances of death
Al-Rawi was killed in his clinic soon after the U.S. invasion. Reports from various secondary sources state that he was assassinated for his political views.

See also
Violence against academics in post-invasion Iraq

References

2003 deaths
Assassinated Iraqi people
Fellows of the Royal College of Surgeons
People murdered in Iraq
Iraqi physiologists
Academic staff of the University of Baghdad
1952 births
University of Baghdad alumni
2003 murders in Iraq